Two Men in Town is a 2014 French-American drama film directed by Rachid Bouchareb and co-written with Olivier Lorelle and Yasmina Khadra. The film stars Forest Whitaker, Harvey Keitel, Ellen Burstyn, Luis Guzmán and Brenda Blethyn. The film is a remake of the José Giovanni film Deux hommes dans la ville.

The film had its premiere in the competition section of the 64th Berlin International Film Festival. It was released in the United States by Cohen Media Group to theaters and iTunes on March 6, 2015.

Plot 
Long-time parole agent Emily Smith, newly arrived in Luna County, New Mexico, is assigned new parolee William Garnett, a career criminal just out of prison. Long-time county sheriff Bill Agati is unhappy about having the felon back on the streets, particularly because Garnett killed a deputy of his almost two decades previous.
Garnett struggles to re-adjust to being outside, and just wants to lead a simple life now.

He has to deal with harassment from Agati and avoid his former criminal associate, Terence Saldano, who is still trafficking illegal immigrants and relentless to see Garnett return to his old ways. Garnett's earlier conversion to Islam and meeting Teresa Flores, a reserved bank employee whom he develops a relationship with, helps him resist falling back into the bad life, and agent Smith tries to help him along.

But Saldano shows up at Flores' home one late afternoon, and intimidates his way in to persuade her to influence Garnett, and when she tells him to leave, he violently assaults her. Garnett comes home that evening to discover this and he then tracks down Saldano to exact revenge.

Cast

Production

Filming 
The shooting of the film began in April 2013 in Albuquerque and Deming, New Mexico.

References

External links 

 
 

2014 films
Films based on works by José Giovanni
Films directed by Rachid Bouchareb
Films set in New Mexico
Films shot in New Mexico
2014 drama films
American drama films
American remakes of French films
French drama films
2010s English-language films
2010s American films
2010s French films